James Edward Abbe (July 17, 1883 – November 11, 1973) was an American photographer.

Background
James Edward Abbe was born in 1883 in Alfred, Maine.  His career as an international photographer was first boosted by the Washington Post, which commissioned him to travel and take photographs of a 16-day voyage with the American battleship fleet to England and France in 1910. Many years later he traveled throughout Europe as a young photojournalist in the late 1920s and early 1930s recording the unstable power struggles of the early 20th century. However, he first made a name for himself photographing theatre stars of the New York stage and subsequently movie stars in New York, Hollywood, Paris, and London throughout the 1920s and 1930s. His unusual technique of working outside the studio set him apart from other photographers of the period. To make money, Abbe sold his photographs to magazines such as Vogue and Vanity Fair, which brought his subjects greater fame.

Famous images
Abbe's most celebrated portraits include his rare double portraits of silent film stars Rudolph Valentino and his wife Natasha Rambova, Lillian and Dorothy Gish, as well as dancers including the Dolly Sisters and Anna Pavlova, all taken in the 1920s. Reflecting the changing fashions in magazines content, Abbe became one of the first photojournalist to submit his work in photo-essays to major publications, including The London Magazine, Vu and the Berliner Illustrirte Zeitung.  He also took photographs during the Spanish Civil War and the Nazis' rise in Germany.

"His life would make a good movie," his daughter Tilly said. In the 1920s and '30s Abbe photographed politicians, stage and film stars—Hitler and Mussolini, Charlie Chaplin and Josephine Baker—and scored the biggest coup of his career when he finagled his way into the Kremlin and, according to Miss Tilly, "tricked" Stalin into posing for him. The result: a rare snapshot of the Soviet dictator smiling. His portrait of Joseph Stalin was famously used to stop rumors that the Soviet leader was dead.

"He called his photography 'a ticket' to the world," Tilly says. "It was partly because of him that I became a dancer. In fact, I'm named after a dancer he photographed, Tilly Losch. He loved ballet, and his favorite subject to photograph was Anna Pavlova. I knew how much he loved dancers, and of course it was very important to me to please my father."

Personal life
Abbe was married four times and had eight surviving children. He first married in 1905 to Eloise Turner who died in November 1907. His second marriage was to Phyllis Edwards, a teacher from Richmond Virginia, whom he married in 1909 and by whom he had three children Elizabeth (Beth) born 1910, Phyllis, born 1911 and James.

This son, from his second marriage, James Abbe Jr was born in 1912; he also became a photographer and later an antiques dealer and worked in the 1940s Harper's Bazaar. The marriage ended when James Abbe travelled to Italy in 1922 with a former Ziegfeld dancer, Polly Platt (née Mary Ann Shorrock), who was part of the company filming Ronald Colman and Lillian Gish in The White Sister (1923) on location in Rome and Naples for which Abbe took stills and advised on special photography. After filming was completed Abbe settled in Paris where his new wife Polly gave birth to the first of three children, Patience Shorrock Abbe on July 22, 1924, followed by Richard W. Abbe (1926–2000)  and then John Abbe (born 1927).

In the late 1930s, Abbe's third marriage to the former Ziegfeld dancer Polly Shorrock ended in divorce. After the failure of this marriage, he married Irene Caby, the mother of ballet dancer and dance teacher Tilly (Matilda) and Malinda (Linda) Abbe.

According to a 2006 interview with his daughter, Tilly Abbe, he was married three times before he met her mother, Irene, and abandoned his third wife and three children to marry Irene. Tilly was born when her father was 56 years old, which would have been about 1939.

One of the obituaries for Patience mentions that she had a surviving (presumably step-)sister Linda.

Books
Abbe's book I Photograph Russia was published in 1934. This work includes eighty photographs taken by Abbe.

Stars of the Twenties, Observed by James Abbe, Text by Mary Dawn Earley, Introduction by Lillian Gish. (1975) London: Thames and Hudson 
James Abbe Photographer, texts by James Abbe, Brooks Johnson and Terence Pepper (2000) Chrysler Museum of Art, Norfolk, Virginia

Sources
 Jeffrey, Ian et al. (1997). The Photography Book. London: Phaidon Press Limited.

References

1883 births
1973 deaths
20th-century American photographers
Fashion photographers
People from Alfred, Maine
Artists from Maine